NDHU Department of Computer Science and Information Engineering (NDHU CSIE) is one of 8 departments within NDHU College of Science and Engineering and widely regarded as top 5 academic department of computer science in Taiwan.

According to Times Higher Education, both its undergraduate and graduate programs rank in the top five among Taiwanese universities. The department ranks highest in Taiwan in academic impact by THE Subject Rankings. According to NTU Ranking, the department ranks Top 350 in the world. It was evaluated A level globally by THE China Subjects Ranking. NDHU CSIE's faculty has 2 IET Fellows, 2 Distinguished Professor, 3 World's Top 2% Scientists.

History

In 1995, NDHU Graduate Institute of Computer Science and Information Engineering was founded by Sy-Yen Kuo (郭斯彥), the Professor of Electrical and Computer Engineering at University of Arizona and Dean of College of Electrical Engineering & Computer Science at National Taiwan University, as the first computer science department in Eastern Taiwan. In 1997, the graduate institute founded bachelor's program and become Department of Computer Science and Information Engineering. In 2000, the department founded its first executive master's program, the alumni include the Da-Kuei Lin (林大馗), the vice-president of KPMG Cyber Security in Taiwan.

In 2001, NDHU CSIE established the 1st PhD program in Computer Science and Information Engineering in Eastern Taiwan. In 2008, with the merger of National Dong Hwa University (NDHU) and National Hualien University of Education (NHUE), NHUE's Graduate Institute of Information Science and Graduate Institute of learning Sciences were merged into the department, which were later integrated into the Graduate Institute of Networking and Multimedia Technology in 2009.

In 2010, the department started English-taught classes and accepting international students application undergraduate, master, PhD. In 2014, following the funding and support from International Cooperation and Development Fund (TaiwanICDF; 國際合作發展基金會) of Ministry of Foreign Affairs, NDHU CSIE founded the International Bachelor's and Master's Program in Computer Science and Information Engineering, which were the 1st international program of B.S. and M.S. in computer science in Taiwan. In 2019, the International Bachelor Program in Computer Science and Information Engineering was selected as TaiwanICDF Scholarship Program, which was the only  computer science program in the scholarship and provided full funding for selected applicants. In 2021, the department's TaiwanICDF Scholarship Program received 158 applications with 9.4% admission rate, which was highest numbers of program application in the TaiwanICDF Scholarship.

Degrees and programs

Undergraduate
NDHU CSIE offer the Bachelor of Science (B.S.) in Computer Science and Information Engineering. The department also offers one 5-year bachelors/masters programs: Bachelor of Science/Master of Science (B.S./M.S.) in Computer Science and Information Engineering and sponsors a minor in computer science available to all NDHU students.

Graduate
NDHU CSIE offers one Ph.D. and two M.S. programs, and provides double degrees and minor jointly with all academic institutions in NDHU.
 Doctor of Philosophy (Ph.D.) in Computer Science and Information Engineering
 Master of Science (M.S.) in Computer Science and Information Engineering
 Executive Masters of Computer Science and Information Engineering

Ranking 

NDHU CSIE' is well regraded as Top 5 and most premier program in Computer Science in Taiwan, which holds same academic status for Computer Science with University of Florida in United States, Kyushu University in Japan, McMaster University in Canada, Lund University in Sweden, and Universität Hamburg in Germany by Times Higher Education World University Ranking. NDHU CSIE is ranked A Level globally for Information and Communication Engineering by THE China Subject Ratings, which is only next to National Taiwan University (A+) and holds same academic status with National Tsing Hua University (A) and National Cheng Kung University (A). According to Academic Ranking of World Universities, it is ranked No.4 in Taiwan and 401-500 in the world for Electrical & Electronic Engineering, which holds same academic status with Kyoto University in Japan, Rice University in United States, and University of Birmingham in United Kingdom.

See also
 NDHU College of Science and Engineering

References

National Dong Hwa University
Computer science departments in Taiwan
1995 establishments in Taiwan